Vadim Dmitriyevich Milyutin (born 8 April 2002) is a Russian football player who plays for Tyumen on loan from PFC Sochi.

Club career
He made his debut in the Russian Premier League for PFC Sochi on 19 June 2020 in a game against FC Rostov, replacing Ivan Novoseltsev in the 56th minute. FC Rostov was forced to field their Under-18 squad in that game as their main squad was quarantined after 6 players tested positive for COVID-19.

References

External links
 
 
 

2002 births
Living people
Russian footballers
Association football defenders
PFC Sochi players
FC Dynamo Brest players
FC Tyumen players
Russian Premier League players
Belarusian Premier League players
Russian expatriate footballers
Expatriate footballers in Belarus
Russian expatriate sportspeople in Belarus